Dennys Bay is a bay in Washington County, Maine.
Located between the towns of Pembroke, Dennysville, and Whiting, it extends roughly 5 mi. (8 km) from Dennysville to Cobscook Bay and is 2 mi. (3 km) at its widest.

Bays of Washington County, Maine
Bays of Maine